The  is a traditional Japanese garment and the national dress of Japan. The kimono is a wrapped-front garment with square sleeves and a rectangular body, and is worn left side wrapped over right, unless the wearer is deceased.

There are different types of kimono for men, women, and children, varying based on the occasion, the season, the wearer's age, and – less commonly in the modern day – the wearer's marital status. Despite the kimono's reputation as a formal and difficult-to-wear garment, there are types of kimono suitable for both formal and informal occasions.

Though previously the most common Japanese garment, the kimono in the present day has fallen out of favour and is rarely worn as everyday dress.

Despite the low number of people who wear kimono regularly and the garment's reputation as a complicated article of clothing, the kimono has experienced a number of revivals in previous decades, and is still worn today as fashionable clothing in Japan.

History

Yamato period to Nara period (300–794 CE) 
The first instances of kimono-like garments in Japan were traditional Chinese clothing introduced to Japan via Chinese envoys in the Kofun period (300–538 CE; the first part of the Yamato period), through immigration between the two countries and envoys to the Tang dynasty court leading to Chinese styles of dress, appearance, and culture becoming extremely popular in Japanese court society. The Imperial Japanese court quickly adopted Chinese styles of dress and clothing, with evidence of the oldest samples of  tie-dyed fabric stored at the Shōsōin Temple being of Chinese origin, due to the limitations of Japan's ability to produce the fabrics at the time. As early as the 4th century CE, images of priestess-queens and tribal chiefs in Japan depicted figures wearing clothing similar that of Han dynasty China.

In 718 CE, the Yoro clothing code was instituted, which stipulated that all robes had to be overlapped at the front with a left-to-right closure, following typical Chinese fashions. This convention of wear is still followed today, with a right-to-left closure worn only by the deceased.

Clothing used by the upper classes was significantly simpler to don and wear than dress from the following Heian period. Sleeves, while narrow, were long enough to cover the fingers, since status was associated with covering more of the body.

Heian period to Azuchi–Momoyama period (794–1600)
During the Heian period (794–1193 CE), Japan stopped sending envoys to the Chinese dynastic courts. This prevented Chinese-imported goods—including clothing—from entering the Imperial Palace. This also prevented dissemination to the upper classes, who were the main arbiters of traditional Japanese culture at the time, and the only people allowed to wear such clothing. The ensuing cultural vacuum facilitated the development of a Japanese culture independent from Chinese fashions. The term is used to refer to Heian-period Japanese culture, particularly that of the upper classes.

Women's clothing in the imperial palace became increasingly stylised in the formal , with some elements being abandoned by both male and female courtiers, such as the round-necked and tube-sleeved  jacket worn by both genders in the early 7th century. Others, such as the wrapped front robes also worn by men and women, were kept. Some elements, such as the  skirt worn by women, continued to in a reduced capacity, worn only to formal occasions; the  grew too narrow to wrap all the way around and became a trapezoidal pleated train.  (trousers) became longer than the legs and also trailed behind the wearer.

During the later Heian period, various clothing edicts reduced the number of layers a woman could wear, leading to the  garment—previously considered underwear—becoming outerwear by the time of the Muromachi period (1336–1573 CE). The  resembled a modern kimono, though at this time the sleeves were sewn shut at the back and were smaller in width (shoulder seam to cuff) than the body of the garment. During the Sengoku period (1467–1615) and the Azuchi–Momoyama period (1568–1600), the decoration of the  developed further, with bolder designs and flashy colours becoming popular.

Edo period (1603–1867)

During the Edo period (1603–1867 CE), both Japan's culture and economy developed significantly. A particular factor in the development of the Edo period was the early Genroku period (1688–1704 CE), wherein "Genroku culture" – luxurious displays of wealth and increased patronage of the arts – led to the further development of many art forms, including those of clothing. Genroku culture was led by the growing and increasingly-powerful merchant classes, whose clothing was representative of their increasing economic power and rivalled the aristocracy and samurai classes, shown by their brightly-coloured kimono that utilised expensive production techniques, such as hand-painted dyework. , a damask fabric, also became the preferred material for kimono at this time, replacing the previously-popular  plain-weave silk, which had been used to create .

In response to the increasing material wealth of the merchant classes, the Tokugawa shogunate issued a number of sumptuary laws on kimono for the lower classes, prohibiting the use of purple or red fabric, gold embroidery, and the use of intricately dyed  patterns. As a result, a school of aesthetic thought known as Iki developed. They valued and prioritised the display of wealth through almost mundande appearance, and the concept of kimono design and wear continues to this day as a major influence.

From this point onwards, the basic shape of both men's and women's kimono remained largely unchanged. The sleeves of the  began to grow in length, especially amongst unmarried women, and the  became much longer and wider, with various styles of knots coming into fashion, alongside stiffer weaves of material to support them.

Modern period

Meiji period (1868–1912)

In 1869, the social class system was abolished, and with them, class-specific sumptuary laws. Kimono with formerly-restricted elements, like red and purple colours, became popular, particularly with the advent of synthetic dyestuffs such as mauvine.

During the Meiji period, the opening of Japan to Western trade after the enclosure of the Edo period led to a drive towards Western dress as a sign of "modernity". After an edict by Emperor Meiji, policemen, railroad workers and teachers moved to wearing Western clothing within their job roles, with the adoption of Western clothing by men in Japan happening at a much greater pace than by women. Initiatives such as the  promoted Western dress as everyday clothing.

Taishō period (1912–1926)
Western clothing quickly became standard issue as army uniform for men and school uniform for boys, and between 1920 and 1930, the  sailor outfit replaced the kimono and undivided  as school uniform for girls. However, kimono still remained popular as an item of everyday fashion; following the Great Kantō Earthquake of 1923, cheap, informal and ready-to-wear  kimono, woven from raw and waste silk threads unsuitable for other uses, became highly popular, following the loss of many people's possessions. By 1930, ready-to-wear  kimono had become highly popular for their bright, seasonally changing designs, many of which took inspiration from the Art Deco movement.  kimono were usually dyed using the ikat technique of dyeing, where either warp or both warp and weft threads (known as ) were dyed using a stencil pattern before weaving.

It was during the Taishō period that the modern formalisation of kimono and kimono types began to emerge. The Meiji period had seen the slow introduction of kimono types that mediated between the informal and the most formal, a trend that continued throughout the Taishō period, as social occasions and opportunities for leisure increased under the abolition of class distinctions. The bridal kimono trousseau, an uncommon practice of the upper classes in the Edo period, also became common throughout the middle classes; traditions of kimono bridalwear for marriage ceremonies were also codified in this time, which resembled the bridalwear of samurai-class women. However,  standards were still relatively informal, and would not become formalised until after World War II.

Shōwa period (1926–1989)

While kimono were no longer common wear for men, they remained everyday wear for Japanese women until World War II (1940–1945).

During the war, kimono factories shut down, and the government encouraged people to wear  (also romanised as ) – trousers constructed from old kimono – instead. Fibres such as rayon became widespread during WWII, being inexpensive to produce and cheap to buy, and typically featured printed designs. Cloth rationing persisted until 1951, so most kimono were made at home from repurposed fabrics.

In the second half of the 20th century, the Japanese economy boomed, and silk became cheaper, making it possible for the average family to afford silk kimono. The kimono retail industry had developed an elaborate codification of rules for kimono-wearing, with types of kimono, levels of formality, and rules on seasonality, which intensified after the war; there had previously been rules about kimono-wearing, but these were not rigidly codified and varied by region and class. Formalisation sought perfection, with no creases or unevenness in the kimono, and an increasingly tubular figure was promoted as the ideal for women in kimono. The kimono-retail industry also promoted a sharp distinction between Japanese and Western clothes; for instance, wearing Western shoes with Japanese clothing (while common in the Taishō period) was codified as improper; these rules on proper dressing are often described in Japanese using the English phrase "Time, Place, and Occasion" (TPO). As neither Japanese men or women commonly wore kimono, having grown up under wartime auspices, commercial  schools were set up to teach women how to don kimono. Men in this period rarely wore kimono, and menswear thus escaped most of the formalisation.).

Bridal trousseaus containing tens of kimono of every possible subtype were also promoted as de rigueur, and parents felt obliged to provide kimono trousseaus that cost up to 10 million yen (~£70,000), which were displayed and inspected publicly as part of the wedding, including being transported in transparent trucks.

By the 1970s, formal kimono formed the vast majority of kimono sales. Kimono retailers, due to the pricing structure of brand new kimono, had developed a relative monopoly on not only prices but also a perception of kimono knowledge, allowing them to dictate prices and heavily promote more formal (and expensive) purchases, as selling a single formal kimono could support the seller comfortably for three months. The kimono industry peaked in 1975, with total sales of 2.8 trillion yen (~£18 billion). The sale of informal brand new kimono was largely neglected.

Heisei period (1989–2019)
The economic collapse of the 1990s bankrupted much of the kimono industry and ended a number of expensive practices. The rules for how to wear kimono lost their previous hold over the entire industry, and formerly-expensive traditions such as bridal kimono trousseaus generally disappeared, and when still given, were much less extensive. It was during this time that it became acceptable and even preferred for women to wear Western dress to ceremonial occasions like weddings and funerals. Many women had dozens or even hundreds of kimono, mostly unworn, in their homes; a secondhand kimono, even if unworn, would sell for about 500 yen (less than £3.50; about US$5), a few percent of the bought-new price. In the 1990s and early 2000s, many secondhand kimono shops opened as a result of this.

In the early years of the 21st century, the cheaper and simpler  became popular with young people. Around 2010, men began wearing kimono again in situations other than their own wedding, and kimono were again promoted and worn as everyday dress by a small minority.

Reiwa period (2019–present)
Today, the majority of people in Japan wear Western clothing in the everyday, and are most likely to wear kimono either to formal occasions such as wedding ceremonies and funerals, or to summer events, where the standard kimono is the easy-to-wear, single-layer cotton .

In 2019, the mayor of Kyoto announced that his staff were working to register "Kimono Culture" on UNESCO's intangible cultural heritage list.

Textiles

Formal kimono are almost always made from silk, with thicker, heavier, stiff or matte fabrics generally being considered informal.

Modern kimono are widely available in fabrics considered easier to care for, such as polyester. Kimono linings are typically silk or imitation silk, and often match the top fabric in fibre type, though the lining of some casual silk kimono may be cotton, wool or linen.

Kimono motifs

Kimono fabrics are often decorated, sometimes by hand, before construction. Though kimono fabrics with woven patterns can still be lightweight,  fabrics with woven patterns are often very heavy, with many formal  being made from thickly-woven brocade. Traditionally, woven kimono are matched with  decorated with dyed patterns, and vice versa, though for all but the most formal kimono, this is more of a general suggestion instead of a strict rule. Formal kimono are almost always decorated with dyed patterns, commonly along the hem.

Many kimono motifs are seasonal, and denote the season in which the kimono can be worn; however, some motifs have no season and can be worn all-year round. Others, such as the combination of pine, plum and bamboo – a grouping referred to as the Three Friends of Winter – are auspicious, and thus worn to formal occasions for the entire year. Colour also contributes to the seasonality of kimono, with some seasons – such as autumn – generally favouring warmer, darker colours over lighter, cooler ones.

A number of different guides on seasonal kimono motifs exist, with some guides – such as those for tea ceremony in particular – being especially stringent on their reflection of the seasons. Motifs typically represent the flora, fauna, landscape or culture of Japan; one such example is cherry blossoms, a famously seasonal motif worn in spring until just before the actual cherry blossoms begin to bloom, it being considered unlucky to try and 'compete' with the cherries. Motifs are typically worn a few weeks before the official 'start' of any given season, as it is considered fashionable to anticipate the coming season.

Though men's kimono historically displayed just as much decoration and variety as women's kimono, in the modern era, the principal distinction of men's kimono in terms of seasonality and occasion is the fabric. The typical men's kimono is a subdued, dark colour; black, dark blues, greens and browns are common. Fabrics are usually matte, in contrast to the occasional satin weaves of some women's kimono. Some men's kimono have a subtle pattern, and texture fabrics are more common in more casual men's kimono. These kimono may also feature slightly brighter colours, such as lighter purples, greens and blues. Sumo wrestlers have occasionally been known to wear quite bright colours, such as fuchsia, in their kimono, which they are required to wear when appearing in public.

Terms

The term  is also used to refer to kimono in general within Japan, particularly within the context of the kimono industry, as traditional kimono shops are referred to as either  or  – with the additional character of  meaning 'shop'.

Merchants' terms

Reuse
Kimono can readily be resized, or unpicked back into  (bolt) lengths.

Outside of being re-woven into new fabrics, worn-out kimono have historically been recycled in a variety of ways, depending on the type of kimono and its original use. When the cloth is worn out, it may be used as fabric for smaller items or to create  (patchwork) kimono (which were also sometimes made for the sake of fashion). The fact that the pattern pieces of a kimono consist of rectangles, and not complex shapes, make reuse in garments or other items easier.  are used to hold cloth together and decorate it. The cloth used for patchwork clothing must all be of similar weight, drape, and handle.

Formal kimono, made of expensive and thin silk fabrics, would have been re-sewn into children's kimono when they became unusable for adults, as they were typically unsuitable for practical clothing; kimono were shortened, with the  taken off and the collar re-sewn to create , or were simply cut at the waist to create a side-tying jacket.

Construction

Kimono linings are made from bolts of the same width.

Some custom bolts of fabric are produced for especially tall or heavy people, such as sumo wrestlers, who must have kimono custom-made by either joining multiple bolts, weaving custom-width fabric, or using non-standard size fabric. For children, in the early 1900s, shorter lengths were used, and sometimes the body of the kimono was made only a single cloth width wide. Tucks were also used to take in the garment; an outwards-facing pleat at each shoulder and a kolpos-like overfold at the hip, so that the child appeared to be wearing a sleeveless vest of the same fabric over their garment. These sewn tucks were let out as the child grew, and are mostly only seen today on the kimono of apprentice geisha in Kyoto, as apprentices previously began their training at a young age, requiring tucks to be let out as they grew. In the present day, apprentices begin their training in their late teenage years, and the tucks are retained merely as an anachronism.

Kimono have a set method of construction, which allows the entire garment to be taken apart, cleaned and resewn easily. As the seam allowance on nearly every panel features two selvedges that will not fray, the woven edges of the fabric bolt are retained when the kimono is sewn, leading to large and often uneven seam allowances; unlike Western clothing, the seam allowances are not trimmed down, allowing for a kimono to be resewn to different measurements without the fabric fraying at the seams. This was also used to prolong the life of the garment by reversing the sleeves (hiding the worn cuff hem in the shoulder seam) or the back panels (swapping the high-stress center seam and the low-stress sides), like the European custom of side-to-middling or end-to-middling bedsheets.

Once cleaned, the fabric would be resewn by hand; this process, though necessary in previous centuries, is uncommon in modern-day Japan, as it is relatively expensive.

Despite the expense of hand-sewing, however, some modern kimono, including silk kimono and all formal kimono, are still hand-sewn entirely; even machine-sewn kimono require some degree of hand-sewing, particularly in finishing the collar, the hem, and the lining, if present. This disguises the stitches, as hand-sewn kimono are not tightly sewn, rendering the stitches visible if pressed entirely flat.

Terms

A number of terms are used to refer to the different parts of a kimono.

These terms refer to parts of a kimono:

Evolution of kimono construction

Though the basic shape of the kimono has not changed in centuries, proportions have, historically, varied in different eras of Japanese history. Court-appropriate dress continued to resemble the previous eras.

In the following centuries, the  mostly retained its small, narrow and round-sleeved nature, with the length of women's sleeves gradually increasing over time and eventually becoming mostly detached from the body of the garment below the shoulders. The collar on both men's and women's  retained its relatively long and wide proportions, and the  front panel kept its long, shallow angle towards the hem. During the Edo period, the  had developed roughly modern kimono proportions, though variety existed until roughly the mid- to later years of the era. Men's sleeves continued to be sewn shut to the body of the kimono down most of their length, with no more than a few inches unattached at the bottom, unlike the women's style of very deep sleeves mostly detached from the body of the kimono. Men's sleeves were also less deep than women's kimono sleeves so that they did not get tied under the narrow  around the hips, whereas on a woman's kimono, the long, unattached bottom of the sleeve could hang over the wider  without getting in the way. Sleeves for both men and women grew in proportion to be of roughly equal width to the body panels, and the collar for both men's and women's kimono became shorter and narrower.

The  is now used for fine length adjustments, and takes up  of excess length. Men's kimono, on the other hand, are cut to the length of the wearer's body and tied with a narrow belt at the hips, with no extra fabric in the kimono's length for an overfold at the hip.

In these instances, the kimono worn is constructed differently to a regular women's kimono: the collar is set back further into the neck, the sleeves are sewn to the body unevenly (further down the front than the back), and the body is elongated.

Sleeve length
The sleeve length (dropping down from the arm towards the floor when held outstretched) varies in kimono.

Cost

Both men's and women's brand-new kimono can range in expense, from the relatively cheap nature of second-hand garments, to high-end artisan pieces costing as much as US$50,000 (not allowing for the cost of accessories).

The high expense of some hand-crafted brand-new kimono reflects the traditional kimono making industry, where the most skilled artisans practice specific, expensive and time-consuming techniques, known to and mastered only by a few. These techniques, such as hand-plied  fabrics and hand-tied  dotwork dyeing, may take over a year to finish. Kimono artisans may be made Living National Treasures in recognition of their work, with the pieces they produce being considered culturally important.

Even kimono that have not been hand-crafted will constitute a relatively high expense when bought new, as even for one outfit, a number of accessories of the right formality and appearance must be bought.

Though artisan-made kimono are some of the most accomplished works of textile art on the market, many pieces are not bought solely for appreciation of the craft. Unwritten social obligations to wear kimono to certain events – weddings, funerals – often leads consumers to purchase artisan pieces for reasons other than personal choice, fashion sense or love of kimono:

The high cost of most brand-new kimono reflects in part the pricing techniques within the industry. Most brand-new kimono are purchased through , where kimono are sold as fabric rolls only, the price of which is often left to the shop's discretion. The shop will charge a fee separate to the cost of the fabric for it to be sewn to the customer's measurements, and fees for washing the fabric or weatherproofing it may be added as another separate cost. If the customer is unfamiliar with wearing kimono, they may hire a service to help dress them; the end cost of a new kimono, therefore, remains uncertain until the kimono itself has been finished and worn.

 are also regarded as notorious for sales practices seen as unscrupulous and pressuring:

In contrast, kimono bought by hobbyists are likely to be less expensive, purchased from second-hand stores with no such sales practices or obligation to buy. Hobbyists may also buy cheaper synthetic kimono (marketed as 'washable') brand-new. Some enthusiasts also make their own kimono; this may be due to difficulty finding kimono of the right size, or simply for personal choice and fashion.

Second-hand items are seen as highly affordable; costs can be as little as ¥100 (about US$0.90) at thrift stores within Japan, and certain historic kimono production areas around the country – such as the Nishijin district of Kyoto – are well known for their second-hand kimono markets. Kimono themselves do not go out of fashion, making even vintage or antique pieces viable for wear, depending on condition.

However, even second-hand women's  are likely to remain somewhat pricey; a used, well-kept and high-quality second-hand  can cost upwards of US$300, as they are often intricately woven, or decorated with embroidery, goldwork and may be hand-painted. Men's , in contrast, retail much cheaper, as they are narrower, shorter, and have either very little or no decoration, though high-end men's  can still retail at a high cost equal to that of a high-end women's .

Types of kimono
Several different types of kimono exist. These varieties are primarily based on formality and gender, with more women's varieties of kimono existing than men's.

In previous centuries, types of kimono were not as distinct, with factors such as age and social class playing a much larger role in determining kimono types than they do presently. Beginning in the Meiji period, and following the Meiji Restoration and the abolition of class distinctions, kimono varieties began to change as Japanese society did, with new varieties being invented for new social situations.

Formality

Kimono range in variation from extremely formal to very casual. For women, the formality is determined mostly by pattern placement, decoration style, fabric choice and colour. For men, whose kimono are generally monochromatic, formality is determined typically by fabric choice and colour. For both men and women, the accessories and  worn with the kimono also determine formality.

The formality levels of different types of kimono are a relatively modern invention, having been developed between late Meiji- to post-war Japan, following the abolition of Edo-period sumptuary clothing laws in 1868. These laws changed constantly, as did the strictness with which they were enforced, and were designed to keep the nouveau riche merchant classes from dressing above their station, and appearing better-dressed than monetarily-poor but status-rich samurai class.

Colours and patterns
Under feudal sumptuary laws, colours were restricted by class; for instance, indigo-dyed clothing was allowed for all classes, and was commonly seen in hand-dyed cotton, linen or hemp  fabrics, but other dyes, such as reds and purples, were forbidden to those below a certain class. Sometimes, for some classes, designs were restricted to below the belt, to the bottoms of the sleeves (for ) or to along the hem; sometimes they were banned altogether, and were transferred to the collar of the underkimono, or the inside of the hem, where only the faintest glimpse would be intermittently visible. Modern-day rules of formality, however, still echo clothing distinctions typically employed by the uppermost samurai classes.

Women's  were once bright and boldly-patterned (and were often kimono too damaged to use as an outer layer, repurposed), but are now typically muted pastel shades. The outside of men's garments tended towards subtle patterns and colours even after the sumptuary laws lifted, with blues and blacks predominating, but designers later came to use browns, greens, purples, and other colours in increasingly bold patterns.

Older people generally wear more subtle patterns, and younger people brighter, bolder ones.

Fabric type

Kimono vary widely in fabric type, and are not all made of silk. Certain types of fabric, such as wool, cotton, linen and hemp, are always considered informal, and so are not seen on more formal varieties of kimono. Some varieties of crêpe are on the lowest end of formal, with their rougher texture considered unsuitable for formal use; other varieties, such as smooth crêpe, are used for all varieties of formal kimono. The most formal kimono are only ever made of smooth, fine silks, such as glossy silk fabrics like habutai.

Despite their informal nature, many types of traditional, informal kimono fabrics are highly-prized for their craftsmanship.

Lined and unlined kimono
In the summer months (from June until October in the most stringent kimono guides, such as those for tea ceremony), kimono are unlined; for the rest of the year, they are lined. This applies to all types of kimono, with a few caveats: the very informal  is always unlined, and thus only worn in summer; the most formal kimono, in contrast, are unlikely to be worn unlined in summer, as many people simply do not have more than one formal kimono to wear, and do not wear formal kimono often enough to warrant the purchase of a new, unlined kimono, just for summer wear.  also change fabric type in the summer months.

Within the two realms of lined and unlined, further distinctions exist for different months. Lined kimono are either made from transparent or gauze fabrics or opaque fabrics, with kimono transitioning towards gauze fabrics at the height of summer and away from them as autumn begins.

The richness of fabrics increases going into November and December, with figured silks featuring woven patterns appropriate. Coming into January, crêpe fabrics with a rougher texture become appropriate, with fabrics such as  worn in February. Figured silks continue to be worn until June, when the unlined season begins again.

Crests
Five crests are the most formal, three crests are mid-formality, and one crest is the least formal, used for occasions such as tea ceremony. The type of crest adds formality as well. A "full sun" crest, where the design is outlined and filled in with white, is the most formal type. A "mid-shadow" crest is mid-formality, with only the outline of the crest visible in white. A "shadow" crest is the least formal, with the outline of the crest relatively faint. Shadow crests may be embroidered onto the kimono, and full-embroidery crests, called , are also seen.

Choice of accessories
Formality can also be determined by the type and colour of accessories. The material, colour, and pattern of these overgarments also varies in formality. Longer  are also more formal.

Sleeve length and construction
Both men's and women's kimono feature sleeves considered relatively short, with men's sleeves shorter than women's. Though lengths can vary by a few centimetres, these lengths are informally standardised.

Men's kimono sleeves are only ever one length, and women's sleeves are limited to a short length suitable for almost all types of kimono, or a longer length used for only one type of formal young women's kimono. In the modern day, the two lengths of women's sleeve worn on kimono are  length, which almost reaches the floor, and a shorter length, used for every other variety of women's kimono. 

Before WWII, the length of women's kimono sleeves varied, with sleeves gradually shortening as a woman got older. During WWII, due to shortage of fabric, the 'short' length of women's kimono sleeves became standardised, and post-WWII, the realm of long kimono sleeves was narrowly curtailed to the realm of  only – formal young women's and girl's kimono, where previously longer sleeves were seen on other varieties of dress, both formal and informal. Pre-WWII women's kimono are recognisable for their longer sleeves, which, though not  length, are longer than most women's kimono sleeves today.

Young women are not limited to wearing only , and outside of formal occasions that warrant it, can wear all other types of women's kimono which feature shorter sleeves.

General types of kimono

 are typically made of lightweight materials, often silk. Women's  and can either be patterned or entirely plain, and modern women's  are frequently white in colour.

Men's  are often dyed in dark colours, and can be made of the same material as the outer kimono, as some kimono fabric bolts are woven with enough length to accommodate this. Men's  are frequently more decorative than women's, often featuring a dyed pictorial scene in the upper back, such as a scene from The Tale of Genji.

In the late 19th and early 20th century, women's  transitioned from being mostly red with bold white motifs to being white or light pastel colours. The dye technique previously used to achieve this, fell out of fashion and knowledge and was rediscovered in 2010.

are casual cotton summer kimono worn by both men and women.  were originally very simple indigo and white cotton kimono, little more than a bathrobe worn either within the house, or for a short walk locally;  were also worn by guests at inns, with the design of the  displaying the inn a person was staying at.

In the present day, many  are brightly coloured, featuring large motifs from a variety of different seasons.

 are always unlined, and it is possible for women to wear a casual  with a high-end, more subdued , often with a  underneath. A high-end men's  could also be dressed up in the same way.

are informal women's kimono. They were the type most often worn as everyday womenswear in pre-war Japan.

 mostly have no  (crests), and the sleeves are fairly short. They are made with a repeating designs, though the repeat length may be quite long. Designs can be made with any method; woven patterns, prints, stencilled patterns in alternating orientations, freehand painting or tie-dye patterns. Traditionally the direction of the fabric was alternated in adjacent panels (necessary due to the lack of shoulder seam), so patterns were generally reversible.

Woven geometric patterns (such as stripes) have no season, but others show images representing the season in general. Woven non-geometric patterns are also common. Small, dense patterns are often used; this is practical, as fine-scale patterns hides stains.

In the modern day, synthetic blends and synthetics are also used; rayon and polyester are common.

are a type of  worn by women characterised by an extremely small repeating pattern, usually done in white on a coloured background. The  dyeing technique is sometimes said to originate in the late Heian period (circa mid-12th century), with a motif called , which shows tiny stylised cherry blossoms on a background of white dots. In the Edo period (1603–1867), the samurai classes used them for  formal wear, with specific patterns becoming associated with specific families.

are monochromatic, undecorated women's kimono mainly worn to tea ceremonies, as the monochrome appearance is considered to be unobtrusive to the ceremony itself. Despite being monochromatic,  may feature a woven design;  suitable for autumn are often made of  damask silk.

are low-ranking women's formalwear, and are a step below , though the two sometimes appear similar or indistinguishable. In older examples, the motifs may instead be placed symmetrically along the hem, with the skirt patterns mirrored down the centre-back seam.

 can have between one and three , and can be worn to parties, but not ceremonies or highly formal events.

 are first roughly sewn up, and the design is sketched onto the fabric, before the garment is taken apart to be dyed again. However, the two can prove near-indistinguishable at times.

 may be worn by both married and unmarried women; often friends of the bride will wear  to weddings (except relatives) and receptions. They may also be worn to formal parties.

are formal women's kimono that feature a design along the hem on a coloured background. , though worn to formal events, may be chosen when a  would make the wearer appear to be overdressed for the situation.

Because formalwear for men requires , men do not wear formal kimono that have elaborate patterns on the hem, as these would be hidden.

are formal women's kimono, featuring a black background and a design along the hem. They are the most formal women's kimono, and are worn to formal events such as weddings and wedding parties. The design is only present along the hem; the further up the body this design reaches, the younger the wearer is considered to be, though for a very young woman an  may be chosen instead,  being considered somewhat more mature. Vintage kimono are more likely to have the former pattern placement than the latter, though this is not a hard rule.

 are always made of silk, and may have a  – a false lining layer – attached, occasionally with a slightly padded hem.

 typically feature , small white decorative prickstitches along the collar.

Occasion-specific types

are a category of kimono and kimono accessories suitable for mourning, worn by both men and women.  kimono,  and accessories are characterised by their plain, solid black appearance.  kimono are plain black silk with five , worn with white undergarments and white . Men wear a kimono of the same kind, with a subdued  and a black-and-white or black-and-grey striped , worn with black or white zōri.

A completely black mourning ensemble for women – a plain black , black  and black  – is usually reserved for those closest to the deceased. Those further away will wear kimono in dark and subdued colours, rather than a plain black kimono with a reduced number of crests. In time periods when kimono were worn more often, those closest to the deceased would slowly begin dressing in coloured kimono over a period of weeks after the death, with the  being the last thing to be changed over to colour.

are highly formal women's over-kimono, worn only by brides or onstage. The name  comes from the Japanese verb , "to drape upon", originating in roughly the 16th century from a fashion among the ruling classes of the time to wear kimono (then called) unbelted over the shoulders of one's other garments; the  progressed into being an over-kimono worn by samurai women before being adopted some time in the 20th century as bridal wear.

Unlike their 16th century counterparts, modern  generally could not double as a regular kimono, as they often feature heavy, highly-formal decoration and may be padded throughout, if not solely on the hem. They are designed to trail along the floor, and the heavily-padded hem helps to achieve this.

Bridal  are typically red or white, and often decorated heavily with auspicious motifs.

are pure-white wedding kimono worn by brides for a traditional Japanese Shinto wedding ceremony. The bride may later change into a red  after the ceremony to symbolise good luck.

A  will form part of a bridal ensemble with matching or coordinating accessories, such as a bridal  (bridal wig), a set of matching  (usually mock-tortoiseshell), and a  fan tucked into the kimono. Due to the expensive nature of traditional bridal clothing, few are likely to buy brand-new ; it is not unusual to rent kimono for special occasions, and Shinto shrines are known to keep and rent out  for traditional weddings. Those who do possess  already are likely to have inherited them from close family members.

() (also known as ) are women's kimono with a specialised construction that allows them to be worn trailing, with a deep-set and widely-spaced collar.  are extremely long kimono worn by geisha, actors in kabuki and people performing traditional Japanese dance.

 are sewn differently to normal kimono due to the way they are worn. The sleeves are set unevenly onto the body, shorter at the back than at the front, so that the underarm does not show when the collar is pulled down.

 are also tied differently when they are put on – whereas regular kimono are tied with a visible , and the side seams are kept straight,  are pulled up somewhat diagonally, to emphasise the hips and ensure the kimono trails nicely on the floor.

Aside from their specialised construction,  can resemble many other types of women's kimono in their decoration, fabric type, colour and sleeve length. The  worn by geisha and their apprentices are formal kimono worn to engagements, and so are always made of fine silk, resembling kimono of  formality and above in their pattern placement and background colour.

The  worn by kabuki actors varies by role, and so can appear as the humble clothing of an Edo-period merchant's daughter, as well as the fine silk clothing of a samurai woman. These costumes may be made of polyester, as well as silk, informal silk fabrics, cotton, linen or hemp. Pattern placement, colour and design varies by role, with many roles having costume designs preserved from previous centuries.

The  worn by people performing traditional Japanese dance typically feature a bold design in block colours, as their clothing must stand out from the stage. Performers performing in a group wear kimono identical to one another, with the bold designs creating visual unity between performers.

Related garments and accessories

Though similar to the kimono, these garments are distinguishable by their separate cultural heritage, and are not considered to be simply 'variations' of kimono such as the clothing worn by the working class is considered to be.

Some related garments still worn today were the contemporary clothing of previous time periods, and have survived on in an official and/or ceremonial capacity, worn only on certain occasions by certain people.

There are a number of accessories that can be worn with the kimono, and these vary by occasion and use. Some are ceremonial, or worn only for special occasions, whereas others are part of dressing in kimono and are used in a more practical sense.

Both geisha and  wear variations on common accessories that are not found in everyday dress.

For certain traditional holidays and occasions some specific types of kimono accessories are worn.

Layering
Pre-WW2, kimono were commonly worn layered, with three being the standard number of layers worn over the top of undergarments. These matching sets would be designed and created together, commonly as part of a bride's outfit for a wedding. Extant intact sets of  kimono are difficult to find, particularly in good condition, with the innermost kimono typically damaged and in poor condition.

In modern Japan, at least one layer is typically worn next to the skin when wearing kimono. A  is typically made of something more washable than silk, such as cotton, hemp, linen or some synthetic fibres.

The  resembles a kimono made of a lighter, thinner fabric, not uncommonly constructed without an  panel at the front, and often has a collar cover known as a  sewn over its collar. The , which is visible at the neckline when worn underneath a kimono, is designed to be replaced and washed when needed.

In modern-day Japan, layered kimono are generally only seen on the stage, whether for classical dances or in kabuki. A false second layer called a  may be attached instead of an entirely separate kimono to achieve this look; the  resembles the lower half of a kimono's lining which, and is sewn to the kimono horizontally along the back. A  may have a false collar attached to it, or a matching false collar sewn to the kimono separately, creating the illusion of a layered kimono at the neckline; separate false sleeve cuffs may also be sewn into the kimono to create this effect.

The  can also be seen on some bridal kimono.

Care

In the past, a kimono would often be entirely taken apart for washing, and then re-sewn for wearing. This traditional washing method is called . Because the stitches must be taken out for washing, traditional kimono need to be hand sewn.  is very expensive and difficult and is one of the causes of the declining popularity of kimono. Modern fabrics and cleaning methods have been developed that eliminate this need, although the traditional washing of kimono is still practiced, especially for high-end garments.

New, custom-made kimono are generally delivered to a customer with long, loose basting stitches placed around the outside edges. They are sometimes replaced for storage. They help to prevent bunching, folding and wrinkling, and keep the kimono's layers in alignment.

Like many other traditional Japanese garments, there are specific ways to fold kimono. These methods help to preserve the garment and to keep it from creasing when stored.

Kimono need to be aired out at least seasonally and before and after each time they are worn. Many people prefer to have their kimono dry cleaned. This may, however, be impossible for certain fabrics or dyes.

Outside of Japan
Kimono are worn outside of Japan in a variety of circumstances. Kimono may be worn to Shinto ceremonies by Brazilian girls of Japanese descent in Curitiba, in the Brazilian state of Paraná.

Kimono are also worn by Japanese Americans, and by other members of the Japanese diaspora overseas. Kimono are collected in the same way as Japanese hobbyists by some non-Japanese, and may be worn to events such as Kimono de Jack gatherings.

See also
 
 List of items traditionally worn in Japan

Notes

References

External links

 The Canadian Museum of Civilization - Archive of the exhibition "The Landscape Kimonos of Itchiku Kubota"
 The Kyoto Costume Museum - Costume History in Japan
 Archived link to the Immortal Geisha Forums; comprehensive resource on kimono knowledge and culture
 Articles on kimono from the V&A Collection

Dresses
Japanese full-body garments
Robes and cloaks
Folk costumes
History of Asian clothing